The Edward VII Monument is a statue of King Edward VII by artist Louis-Philippe Hébert and located at Phillips Square in Montreal, Quebec, Canada.

Overview
Designed by Louis-Philippe Hébert, the monument to King Edward VII was in 1914 erected in Phillips Square, in front of Morgan's department store. The statue was unveiled on October 1, 1914, by Edward's brother, Governor General Prince Arthur, Duke of Connaught and Strathearn, with a huge crowd in attendance. Edward had visited Montreal in 1860, when he was the Prince of Wales, to open the Victoria Bridge.

Four allegorical figures sit at the base of the monument: Peace is the woman at front, holding an olive branch but keeping a sword hidden in the folds of her skirt. The western group is Four Nations, representing Montreal’s four founding nationalities—French, Scots, Irish, and English—living together in harmony. At the back of the monument, Winged Genius represents liberty; the angel has broken the shackles of religious prejudice and persecution and is intended as a reminder of the King's extended respect and dignity to all his subjects, regardless of race, colour, or creed. Abundance is on the eastern face, representing Canada's material prosperity.

Gallery

See also
 Royal monuments in Canada

References

External links
  Fiche sur le Square Phillips
 Monument Edouard VII

1914 in Canada
1914 sculptures
Allegorical sculptures in Canada
Bronze sculptures in Canada
Buildings and structures completed in 1914
Downtown Montreal
Edward VII
Monuments and memorials in Montreal
Outdoor sculptures in Montreal
Royal monuments in Canada
Sculptures by Louis-Philippe Hébert
Sculptures of men in Canada
Sculptures of women in Canada
Statues in Canada
Statues of monarchs
Cultural depictions of Edward VII